Robert Ray Turner (August 10, 1934 – June 19, 2022) was an American politician. A Democrat, he served as a member of the Texas House of Representatives from 1991 to 2003. He died June 19, 2022, at age 87.

References

1934 births
2022 deaths
20th-century American politicians
21st-century American politicians
Democratic Party members of the Texas House of Representatives